Ibn Abbad, also known to the as Benavert, was the last Emir of Sicily. He ruled from 1071 to 1086.

References 

 Michele Amari, Storia dei Musulmani di Sicilia, Catane, 1939

1086 deaths
11th-century Arabs
Emirs of Sicily
Year of birth unknown
Slave owners